Beyond Recall is the twenty-third album by German electronic music pioneer Klaus Schulze, released in June 1991 by Virgin Records' subsidiary label Venture Records. This is one of seven early-1990s Klaus Schulze albums not to be reissued by Revisited Records.

The album marked the beginning of Schulze's "sample" period, in which his albums mostly made use of pre-recorded sounds, amongst of which included animal growls, screeching birds and female voices. Sampling was phased out with his 1995 album In Blue.

Track listing
All tracks composed by Klaus Schulze.

Personnel
 Klaus Schulze - synthesizers, keyboards, sampler, drum programming, arrangement and production
 Fredi Palm - studio maintenance
 Werner Eggert - sound sampling
 Charly Höhr - hardware coordination
 Peeti Unglaub - cover illustration

Release history

External links
 Beyond Recall at the official site of Klaus Schulze
 

Klaus Schulze albums
1991 albums